Mektek Studios is a Canadian video game development studio based in Saint John, New Brunswick. Their first game, Heavy Gear Assault, is currently under development. It will be published by StompyBot Productions.

History
Mektek Studios started as a MechWarrior 4: Mercenaries Modification group which introduced new playable Mechs to the game. They partnered with Smith & Tinker to release MechWarrior 4 along with their modifications on their site for free in 2009.

On 20 May 2013, Mektek began a kickstarter for Heavy Gear Assault which was cancelled. Stating they are "currently evaluating other strategies to raise awareness regarding Heavy Gear and looking at multiple means to get the Heavy Gear name out there."

On 20 February 2015, Mektek hosted their first tournament which was backed by MSI and Razer

Development history

References

External links

Video game development companies
Companies based in Saint John, New Brunswick
Video game companies established in 2006
Video game companies of Canada